Scio is a census-designated place comprising the primary settlement in the town of Scio, Allegany County, New York, United States. As of the 2010 census it had a population of 609, out of a total population of 1,833 in the town.

Geography

Demographics

References

Hamlets in New York (state)
Census-designated places in Allegany County, New York
Census-designated places in New York (state)
Hamlets in Allegany County, New York